Josep Carles Laínez (born 1970) is a Spanish writer who lives in Valencia, Spain and Encamp, Andorra. A graduate of the University of Valencia in Catalan and Spanish Philology and Audio-visual Communication, his main interest is in European minority languages, and he has published original books and/or articles in Catalan, English, Spanish, Occitan, Aragonese and Asturian. He is currently the Editor-in-chief of the literary-philosophical quarterly journal Debats.

In his book of poetry Música junto al río (Music by the River, 2001), he uses a dialectal Valencian-Aragonese from the region of his parents. His book La piedra ente la ñeve (The Stone in the Snow, 2010) is notable as the first Latter-day Saint-related book published in Asturian and the first to use the Deseret alphabet for a language other than English. He has also published a translation of aphorisms from the Asturian into the Spanish language (Ene marginalia, 2003). 

Laínez is a columnist for the Andorran newspaper El Periòdic d'Andorra, and has been a visiting professor at the National Autonomous University of Mexico, University of Puerto Rico, Hofstra University of New York and Komazawa University of Tokyo.

Publications

In Spanish
Poetry
 Exotica martyria, Valencia: Ojuebuey, 1991
 Música junto al río, Valencia: Llambert Palmart, 2001. 
Fiction
 Alma, Valencia: Ediciones de la Mirada, 1998. 
 Una noche más, Valencia: Llambert Palmart, 2002. 
Non-Fiction
 La tumba de Leónidas, Barcelona: Áltera, 2006. 
 Aquí la noche tiene el nombre de Valeria, Valencia: Institució Alfons el Magnànim, 2007.

In Catalan 
Poetry
 Dionysiaka, Alzira: Germania, 1995
 Anxia, Alzira: Bromera, 2001
Drama
 Berlín, Valencia: Llambert Palmart, 2001.

In Asturian 
Poetry
  La piedra ente la ñeve, Uviéu: Trabe, 2010. 
Drama
 Elsa metálico, Uviéu: Academia Llingua Asturiana, 1998. 
 Thule, Uviéu: Academia Llingua Asturiana, 2010.

In Aragonese 
Poetry
 En o gudrón espigol xuto, Teruel: Sur Edizions, 1991.
 Aire de liloileras: (peruigilium veneris), Uesca: Consello d'a Fabla Aragonesa, 1992. 
 A besita de l'ánchel, Uesca: Consello d'a Fabla Aragonesa, 1994. 
 Bel diya, Uesca: Consello d'a Fabla Aragonesa, 1998.

References

Bibliography 
 Ballester Añón, Rafael, “Poetas de los noventa”, in PosData, Levante-EMV (Valencia, December 1992).
 Barrero, Miguel, “Josep Carles Laínez medita nun llibru sobre l’espíritu de Castiella”, in Les Noticies, 573 (February 2008), p. 17.
 Bellveser, Ricardo, Vita Nuova. Antología de escritores valencianos en el fin de siglo, Valencia: Ajuntament de València, 1993, pp. 231, 236.
 Bolado García, Xosé, “El Surdimientu. El Teatru”, in RAMOS CORRADA, Miguel (coord.), Historia de la Lliteratura Asturiana, Oviedo: Academia de la Llingua Asturiana, 2002, pp. 706–707.
 Cepero I Salat, Carles, “Introducción a un ensayo sobre la evolución de la poesía aragonesa”, in NAGORE LAÍN, Francho, Francho Rodés & Chesús Vázquez, Estudios y rechiras arredol de a luenga aragonesa y de a suya literatura, Huesca, Instituto de Estudios Altoaragoneses, 1999, pp. 283–298.	
 Eito Mateo, Antón, "Breve acercamiento a la poesía aragonesa contemporánea", in Ianua, 1.
 Llopesa, Ricardo, Poetas Valencianos del 90. Antología y diccionario, Valencia, Instituto de Estudios Modernistas: 2000, pp. 29–31, 102.
 Nagore Laín, Francho, “La llengua aragonesa: entre l’extinció i la normativització”, in Miquel-Àngel Pradilla Cardona (coord.), Calidoscopi lingüístic. Un debat entorn de les llengües de l’Estat, Barcelona, Octaedro, 2004, pp. 215–244.
 Parra Ruiz, Cristofo Ch., “Os haikus en a poesía feita en aragonés”, in NAGORE LAÍN, Francho (ed.), Terzera trobada d’estudios e rechiras arredol d’a luenga aragonesa e a suya literatura, Huesca, Instituto de Estudios Altoaragoneses-Consello d’a Fabla Aragonesa, 2004, pp. 279–296.
 RodrÍguez Magda, Rosa María, “La poesía en aragonés de Josep Carles Laínez: Generación X, American way of life y posmodernidad”, in Nagore Laín, Francho (ed.), Terzera trobada d’estudios e rechiras arredol d’a luenga aragonesa e a suya literatura, Huesca, Instituto de Estudios Altoaragoneses-Consello d’a Fabla Aragonesa, 2004, pp. 379–386.

External links 
 Debats website
 Aunque tal vez... Personal blog (includes picture) (in Spanish)
 Some Other Words  Personal blog (includes picture) (in English)

1970 births
Living people
Spanish male writers
Spanish Latter Day Saints
Latter Day Saint writers
Aragonese-language writers
People from Valencia
People from Encamp
Spanish expatriates in Andorra